Golani Interchange, known as Maskana Junction in Arabic, is a key road interchange in the Lower Galilee region of northern Israel, located east of Haifa and west of Tiberias, at the intersection of highways 65 and 77.  The Golani Brigade Museum commemorating the Golani Brigade is situated there.

History
The previous at-grade intersection at Golani Junction experienced frequent traffic congestion on weekends and holidays when many Israelis traveled to the north of the country on vacation.  Construction began in 2012 on an interchange to replace the former junction at a cost of NIS 300 million.  The interchange opened for traffic in August 2013.

References

Road interchanges in Israel